Leonel Godoy Rangel (born June 5, 1950 in Lázaro Cárdenas, Michoacán) is a Mexican lawyer, politician, and former Governor of Michoacán.  He is a former president of the Party of the Democratic Revolution (PRD).

Political career
Leonel Godoy began his political career in his native Michoacán serving in various positions during the governorship of Cuauhtémoc Cárdenas. He served in the Chamber of Deputies from 1994 to 1997. In 1997 he joined the cabinet of Cuauhtémoc Cárdenas's government in the Federal District. Godoy has also served in the cabinets of Andrés Manuel López Obrador (Federal District) and Lázaro Cárdenas Batel (Michoacán). Godoy hails from the coastal region of Michoacán.

Godoy was elected to the Senate as a joint PRD-PT-CD candidate, representing the state of Michoacán, in the federal election held on July 2, 2006. In June 2007 he was elected by the Party of the Democratic Revolution (PRD) as candidate for governor of Michoacán for the November 11 state election. According to the Preliminary Results Program (PREP) he won the election with nearly 38% of the votes and assumed office in February 2008.

Godoy is the second governor elected for Mexican's PRD Party in Michoacan State Government. He propose a new scheme in secretaries based in youth, women, migration Native People and other unprotected condition social sectors.

External links
Official Facebook profile
Hi5 Web Page

References

1950 births
Living people
Members of the Chamber of Deputies (Mexico)
Members of the Senate of the Republic (Mexico)
Presidents of the Party of the Democratic Revolution
20th-century Mexican lawyers
People from Lázaro Cárdenas, Michoacán
Politicians from Michoacán
Governors of Michoacán
21st-century Mexican politicians
Universidad Michoacana de San Nicolás de Hidalgo alumni
National Autonomous University of Mexico alumni
20th-century Mexican politicians
Academic staff of Universidad Michoacana de San Nicolás de Hidalgo